Talk Is Cheap: Volume 4 is the 14th live spoken word album by Henry Rollins, released December, 2004 on 2.13.61 Records. It was recorded on April 16, 2004 at San José State University in San José, CA. Clocking in at nearly 160 minutes, it is his longest release to date.

Track listing

Disc 1
 "Warming Up the Spleen" - 6:35
 "First On the List" - 5:05
 "Bush, of Course" - 13:00
 "Let's Go To Mars" - 5:17
 "Spina Bifida Boy" - 8:23
 "Sermonizing From the Mount" - 5:28
 "Unleash the Compassion!" - 35:46

Disc 2
 "Kevin and Sean" - 18:33
 "The Conversation Pt. 1" - 11:50
 "The Conversation Pt. 2" - 14:24
 "I Can't Get Behind That!" - 35:10

Credits
Mike Curtis - Recording
Rae Di Leo - Mixing

2004 live albums
Henry Rollins live albums
Live spoken word albums
Live comedy albums
Spoken word albums by American artists
2.13.61 live albums